The Informers is a collection of short stories, linked by the same continuity, written by American author Bret Easton Ellis. The collection was first published as a whole in 1994. Chapters 6 and 7, "Water from the Sun" and "Discovering Japan", were published separately in the UK by Picador in 2007. The stories display attributes similar to Ellis's novels Less than Zero, The Rules of Attraction, and, to a lesser extent, American Psycho. Like many of Ellis's novels, the stories are set predominantly in California.

Stories

Film adaptation

A film version of the book has been produced from a script by Ellis and Nicholas Jarecki and was screened at the 2009 Sundance film festival. It was directed by Gregor Jordan and featured an ensemble cast, such as Winona Ryder, Billy Bob Thornton, Mickey Rourke, Amber Heard and Kim Basinger. It was Brad Renfro's last film before his death.

Criticism
Reviewing the book for The New York Times, Michiko Kakutani wrote that Ellis had written "a novel that is as cynical, shallow and stupid as the people it depicts." By contrast, in the London Evening Standard, Will Self said that "The Informers shows the work of a writer at the peak of his powers, deeply concerned with the moral decline of our society."

Audiobook 
In 2009, Audible.com produced an audio version of The Informers, narrated by Christian Rummel and Therese Plummer, as part of its Modern Vanguard line of audiobooks.

References

External links
 

1994 short story collections
Alfred A. Knopf books
American satirical novels
Books adapted into films
Books with cover art by Chip Kidd
Novels by Bret Easton Ellis
Novels set in California
Postmodern novels
American short story collections